The Pavllë (- Pavla) is a river in northwestern Greece and southern Albania. Its source is in the Mourgana mountains in Greece, near the village Ampelonas, Thesprotia. It flows west into Albania, along the villages Vagalat and Shkallë. It flows into the Ionian Sea a few kilometres southwest of the archaeological site Butrint. There is a bridge across the river near the village Ampelonas, built in 1798.

References

Rivers of Albania
Rivers of Greece
Landforms of Thesprotia
Rivers of Epirus (region)
Geography of Vlorë County
Drainage basins of the Ionian Sea
International rivers of Europe